Donna P. Davis is an American physician who became the first African-American woman to enter the United States Navy as a medical doctor in 1975.

Education 
Donna P. Davis, a native of New York City, attended and graduated Cornell University in Ithaca, New York. After receiving her Bachelor of Arts degree, she then attended Meharry Medical College in Nashville, Tennessee. While studying at Meharry, she received countless awards including the Bache Scholarship, the Leopold Schapp Foundation Award, the C.V. Mosby Award in Medicine, and the American Association Medical College Fellowship in 1972. In 1973, Davis graduated with her doctorate in medicine and took on an internship at Harlem Hospital in New York City where she became educated in physical and psychiatric care.

U.S. Navy 
In 1975, Donna P. Davis became the first African-American female physician to enter the United States Navy when she was commissioned as a lieutenant on April 25 at the Navy Recruiting District in Jacksonville, Florida. Her first tour of duty was at the Oakland Navy Hospital in California.

Family life 
While at her first duty at the Oakland Navy Hospital, she met her husband James Hammel, who was also serving active duty there. Donna and James moved to Southern California in 1977 where they eventually had two sons, Grant and Damien. On September 16, 2020, her husband died at the age of ninety-five.

Today 
After leaving active duty, Davis opened her own clinic in Yorba Linda, California, where she still practices today.

References 

Living people
Year of birth missing (living people)
African-American women physicians
Meharry Medical College alumni
Cornell University alumni
United States Navy Medical Corps officers
People from Yorba Linda, California
20th-century American naval officers
Female United States Navy officers
20th-century American women physicians
20th-century American physicians
21st-century American women physicians
21st-century American physicians
21st-century American naval officers
20th-century African-American women
20th-century African-American physicians
21st-century African-American women
21st-century African-American physicians
Military personnel from California